Carlos "Carlinhos" Gracie Jr. is a Brazilian 8th-degree coral belt Brazilian jiu-jitsu practitioner and coach. A member of the Gracie family, he is the son of Carlos Gracie, one of the founders of Brazilian Jiu-Jitsu.

Career
Gracie is the founder of the Confederação Brasileira de Jiu-Jitsu (CBJJ), also known as International Brazilian Jiu-Jitsu Federation (IBJJF), jiu jitsu's governing body which runs multiple tournaments around the world, including the World Jiu-Jitsu Championship, Pan Jiu-Jitsu Championship and European Jiu-Jitsu Championship. He is a co-founder of the Gracie Barra team.

Personal life
Carlinhos is one of twenty-one children fathered by Brazilian jiu-jitsu co-founder Carlos Gracie. He has three children: daughter Caroline, and sons Kayron and  Kyan. Kayron is a black belt under his father and is a professor at Gracie Barra Rancho Santa Margarita. Gracie is also the founder and director of Gracie Magazine, a monthly Brazilian jiu-jitsu publication.

Instructor lineage 
Kanō Jigorō → Mitsuyo Maeda → Carlos Gracie Sr. → Helio Gracie → Carlos Gracie Jr.

See also
 List of Brazilian Jiu-Jitsu practitioners

Notes

References 

Sportspeople from Rio de Janeiro (city)
Martial arts school founders
1956 births
Living people
Carlos Jr.
IBJJF Hall of Fame inductees
People awarded a coral belt in Brazilian jiu-jitsu